2016 in Korea may refer to:
2016 in North Korea
2016 in South Korea